Armando V. Salarza is an internationally acclaimed concert organist, harpsichordist, conductor and the titular organist of the Bamboo Organ of Las Piñas City, Philippines.

Musical background
He started piano lessons at age 7 under Donna Ofrasio and organ lessons two years later under Wolfgang Oehms and Professor Amador Hernandez. He gave his first public performance at the age of 11 and shortly thereafter became the youngest finalist in the National Music Competitions for Young Artists (NAMCYA) piano competition. He took further lessons in piano under Fr. Manuel Maramba, OSB.  At 14, he was the official accompanist of the Las Piñas Boys Choir.

Immediately after high school, he was sent to the Universität für Musik und darstellende Kunst Graz, Austria as the first scholar through the Bamboo Organ Foundation. While still a student, he was specially selected by the Institute for Church Music to be an organ instructor for the Diocese of Graz and other parishes in Kärnten as part of the institute's outreach program.  He graduated with distinction in 1988 and earned the title Magister Artium - Master of Arts degree in Church Music and a Teacher's Certificate in Organ.

From 1988 to 1992, he went on to pursue a Postgraduate Course Orgel Konzertfach (Organ Concert Performance) at the Universität für Musik und darstellende Kunst in Wien (Vienna, Austria) and simultaneously took Master classes and workshops in organ, harpsichord, orchestra and choral conducting in various institutions in Europe, among them, Universidad de Salamanca in Spain and the University of Cambridge in the United Kingdom on a scholarship grant by the British Council. His teachers and mentors were prominent figures in classical music – Johann Trummer, Ernst Triebel and Herbert Tachezi for the organ; Gordon Murray for the harpsichord; Franziska Hammer-Drexler for voice; Josef Döller, John Rutter (choral composition) and Stephen Cleobury for choral conducting; Guy Bovet, Montserrat Torrent, John Scott, and Harald Vogel for selective Master classes in organ.

International and local pipe organ performances
Recognized as a premier concert organist, he has given performances in Austria, Germany, Belgium, Rome, Switzerland, Czech Republic, Poland, Finland and the United States of America. Since 1984, he has been performing regularly at the annual International Bamboo Organ Festival in his homeland.

Professor Salarza returned to the Philippines in 1992 and was bestowed with the honor of Organiste Titulaire of the Bamboo Organ. He inaugurated the Klais organ of the EDSA Shrine and the other prominent pipe organs in the country like the organ of the Manila Cathedral, the Spanish Colonial organs of San Agustin Church in Intramuros, Manila and the Holy Trinity Parish on the island of Loay, Bohol; and the largely Philippine-built organs of St. Joseph's Academy Auditorium in Las Piñas, Immaculate Conception Cathedral in Pasig, San Carlos Seminary in Makati, San Sebastian Cathedral in Lipa City, Batangas and the Cebu Metropolitan Cathedral. He was featured in several classical concerts in the country, notably, the Cultural Center of the Philippines Filipino Artists Series in 1995 and the Philippine Philharmonic Orchestra Signature Series 2000–2001 with Oscar Yatco.

His most recent inaugural concerts were with the newly restored pipe organs of Basilica Minore del Sto. Niño de Cebu and St. John the Baptist of Jimenez in Misamis Occidental in April and June 2011, respectively.

He was recently invited to play the Pels organ at the Manila Cathedral during the Papal Visit of Pope Francis in Manila last January 2015.

Conductor
While still a student in Austria, he served as assistant conductor at the Papal Visit by then Pope John Paul II in 1987.  In 2003, he took over the helm of the Las Piñas Boys Choir as Official Conductor and trainer. Under his tutelage, the Las Piñas Boys Choir emerged as the World Champion in the Children's Choir Category of the 5th World Choir Games held in Graz, Austria in July 2008, besting 54 other contenders worldwide.

Today, his expertise as a conductor is often sought either to judge choral competitions like regionals or finals of National Music Competitions for Young Artists (NAMCYA) organized by the Cultural Center of the Philippines or to teach other children and adult choirs in other schools and parishes.

Awards and recognition
In 1986, he received a special recognition award called the Würdigungspreis from the Austrian Federal Ministry of Science and Research.

He was presented with the Kawayan Award for Music Category by the Rotary Club of Las Piñas in 1996.

He has been featured in various international and local newspapers and programs including LA Times, Kingston Gleaner, Bravo Filipino, EHEMPLO, The Filipino Channel's (TFC) Power of the People and Bravura, Channel News Asia's Yours Truly Asia, to name a few.

Current activities
To date, Professor Salarza continues to display the versatility of his musical talent as an organist, harpsichordist, ensemble player and conductor - performing for special events, music festivals and concerts here and abroad. He performs yearly at the International Bamboo Organ Festival.

Professor Salarza is currently the Artistic director of the International Bamboo Organ Festival and a faculty member of the University of the Philippines College of Music, St. Scholastica's College of Music and the Manila Cathedral – Basilica Institute of Liturgical Music. He also teaches aspiring organists from different parishes and schools nationwide and gives pipe organ appreciation workshops.

Discography
 Twenty Years: Bamboo Organ Festival featuring solo organ performances by Luigi Ferdinando Tagliavini, Armando Salarza and Wolfgang Oehms from the Bamboo Organ Foundation.
 Bach on the Bamboo Organ. Bamboo Organ Foundation (Released Feb. 1996).
 The Bamboo Organ & Brass, a Bamboo organ concert with brass instruments with Theo Mertens, Carlos Martens, Armando Salarza and Gerardo Fajardo, from Bamboo Music  (Released Feb. 1999).
 Armando V. Salarza on the Historic Bamboo Organ, a CD compilation of performances from the International Bamboo Organ Festival (Released Nov. 2010).

References

External links
 Web Site of Armando Salarza
 Official Website of the Bamboo Organ Foundation, Inc
 BambooMusic, musical instruments made from bamboo.

Male organists
Filipino classical musicians
Living people
Filipino harpsichordists
Filipino organists
Year of birth missing (living people)
Place of birth missing (living people)
University of Music and Performing Arts Vienna alumni
People from Las Piñas
Musicians from Metro Manila
21st-century organists
21st-century male musicians